Loxostege aeruginalis is a species of moth in the family Crambidae. It is found in France, Spain, Italy, Croatia, Hungary, Romania, Bulgaria, the Republic of Macedonia, Albania, Greece, Ukraine, Russia and Turkey.

The wingspan is about 30 mm.

References

Moths described in 1796
Pyraustinae
Moths of Europe
Moths of Asia